Water 1st International is a non-profit organization whose stated goal is helping people in poor countries implement water, sanitation and hygiene education projects.  Water 1st works through locally based partner organizations to support the implementation of projects that include the provision of drinking water, hygiene education, and sanitary latrines. It is based in Seattle, Washington (United States), and to date has supported the construction of 1,100 water systems in India, Bangladesh, Ethiopia, and Honduras benefiting over 120,000 people. To help ensure long-term sustainability, the communities supported by Water 1st are involved in every step of the planning, implementing and financing of their projects.

Water 1st is a member of the End Water Poverty coalition and Water Advocates.

In 2008, Water 1st launched a new event called CARRY 5.  CARRY 5 is a Walk for Water to raise awareness of the global water crisis and funds to support the implementation of projects.  In 2009–10, there were multiple CARRY 5 events in Seattle and other locations worldwide.

Water 1st is working with schools to educate children about the global water crisis.  As part of this effort, they have created a media library on their website and on YouTube.

References

Global water crisis - Pacific Institute
Water crisis facts and figures - World Health Organization
The right to water (UN Committee on Economic, Social and Cultural Rights) - United Nations

External links
Water 1st - official website
The WaterLog - blog
Water 1st International at IRC Water and Sanitation Centre
ABC News, Channel 15 (Phoenix) Walk in Tempe aims to help give clean water around the globe - March 22, 2010
Arizona Daily Star UA event highlights water issues - May 4, 2009
Seattle Post-Intelligencer Quenching the thirst: Seattle brings the most precious liquid abroad - March 22, 2008
The Chronicle of Philanthropy Charity Hopes to Put an End to Villages' Water Woes - October 18, 2007
Puget Sound Business Journal Water 1st makes grants to help groups that help themselves- November 17, 2006
World Water Day 2007 video clip - Water 1st participates in March 22, 2007 Walk for Water on World Day for Water
ParentMap magazine A heartbreaking need for clean water - April 1, 2007

Development charities based in the United States
Non-profit organizations based in Seattle
Environmental organizations based in the United States
Water-related charities
Charities based in Washington (state)